Ulrick Chérubin (December 24, 1943 – September 25, 2014) was a Canadian politician, who served as mayor of Amos, Quebec, from 2002 until his death in 2014. He was one of the first Black Canadians to be elected a mayor in Quebec. Like other black mayors in Quebec history, Chérubin led a municipality which is virtually entirely white and Québécois.

Early life
The youngest of five children, Chérubin was born in Jacmel, Haiti, in 1943. He was educated in Haiti, where he was a childhood friend and classmate of Michel Adrien, who would later become mayor of Mont-Laurier, Quebec.

Fleeing the dictatorship regime of François Duvalier, Chérubin left Haiti while he was still studying mathematics in a Port-au-Prince university.  He moved to Canada in 1970 to study education at the Université du Québec à Trois-Rivières, and subsequently taught religion in Cap-de-la-Madeleine. In 1971, he married Immacula Morriset, a nurse also originally from Haiti.

Chérubin continued to teach in 1973, and also studied administration and English as a Second Language teaching at the Université du Québec en Abitibi-Témiscamingue. He moved to Amos in 1974.

Political career
Chérubin was first elected as a municipal councillor in Amos in 1994, winning his seat with a five-hundred vote majority. After being re-elected unopposed as a councillor in 1998, Chérubin was elected to the position of mayor of Amos. In 2004, he was awarded the Jackie Robinson Award, in honour of his status as a pioneering Black Canadian, by the Montreal Association of Black Business Persons and Professionals.

In 2009, city councillors Charles Yancey and Chuck Turner of Boston, Massachusetts, sponsored a motion declaring January 2, 2010, to be Ulrick Chérubin Day in the City of Boston, when he visited the city.

Chérubin was most recently re-elected in 2013, winning his fourth consecutive term, winning 73% of the vote in a victory over Amos municipal councillor Éric Mathieu.

On November 10, 2013, Chérubin appeared on Le Banquier, the Quebec version of Deal or No Deal, where he won a total of $222,500. Chérubin, who was selected to take part in the program out of a pool of eight thousand initial applicants, appeared in order to promote and raise funds for the centennial celebration of the town of Amos.

Death
On September 25, 2014, Chérubin died in Amos, aged 70 from cardiac failure.

References

External links
 Official Mayoral webpage (in French)

1943 births
2014 deaths
Black Canadian politicians
Haitian Quebecers
Haitian emigrants to Canada
Naturalized citizens of Canada
Mayors of Amos, Quebec
People from Jacmel